Ukraine has participated twice in the Eurovision Young Musicians since its debut in 2008, most recently taking part in 2012. Ukraine was expected to return in 2020.

Participation overview

See also
Ukraine in the Eurovision Song Contest
Ukraine in the Eurovision Dance Contest
Ukraine in the Junior Eurovision Song Contest
Ukraine in the Türkvizyon Song Contest

References

External links
 Eurovision Young Musicians

Countries in the Eurovision Young Musicians
Ukraine in music contests and competitions